John Henshall may refer to:

 John Henshall (footballer), footballer for Burslem Port Vale
 John Henshall (photographer) (born 1942), British photographer, cinematographer, and writer
 John Henry Henshall (1856–1928), British watercolourist and etcher